Radoslav Radulović (born 19 November 1972) is a Bosnian-Herzegovinian former professional football who played as a central defender.

Career
Born in Banja Luka, SR Bosnia and Herzegovina, he started his career playing in Serbia with FK Zemun in the First League of FR Yugoslavia. In 1998, he moved to Spain and played two and a half seasons in UE Lleida. In January 2001, he returned to FK Zemun, before moving in 2002 to Israeli club Hapoel Kfar Saba where he played one season. Next, he moved to Sweden where he represented Enköpings SK for two seasons (where already had played earlier in 1999), and since January 2005, he played with Spanish club FC Benavent until 2010.

External sources
 Profile at Srbijafudbal

1972 births
Living people
Sportspeople from Banja Luka
Serbs of Bosnia and Herzegovina
Association football defenders
Serbian footballers
Bosnia and Herzegovina footballers
FK Zemun players
UE Lleida players
Enköpings SK players
FK Rad players
Hapoel Kfar Saba F.C. players
First League of Serbia and Montenegro players
Segunda División players
Allsvenskan players
Superettan players
Israeli Premier League players
Primera Catalana players
Bosnia and Herzegovina expatriate footballers
Expatriate footballers in Spain
Expatriate footballers in Israel
Expatriate footballers in Sweden
Serbian expatriate sportspeople in Spain
Serbian expatriate sportspeople in Israel
Serbian expatriate sportspeople in Sweden
Bosnia and Herzegovina expatriate sportspeople in Spain
Bosnia and Herzegovina expatriate sportspeople in Israel
Bosnia and Herzegovina expatriate sportspeople in Sweden